Richard Gómez (born 19 August 1972) is a Paraguayan footballer. He played in four matches for the Paraguay national football team in 1997. He was also part of Paraguay's squad for the 1997 Copa América tournament.

References

External links
 

1972 births
Living people
Paraguayan footballers
Paraguay international footballers
Place of birth missing (living people)
Association football midfielders